Pearland Regional Airport  is in Brazoria County, Texas, near Pearland in Greater Houston,  south of Downtown Houston. It was formerly  Clover Field.

Most U.S. airports use the same three-letter location identifier for the FAA and IATA, but Pearland Regional Airport is LVJ to the FAA and has no IATA code.

It was in the Pearland city limits from November 27, 2017, until March 26, 2018.

Facilities
In the year ending May 30, 2000 the airport had 87,125 aircraft operations, average 238 per day: 99.7% general aviation and 0.3% air taxi. 175 aircraft were then based at the airport: 94% single-engine, 2% multi-engine and 4% helicopter.

History
The airport opened in 1950 and is owned by Clover Acquisition Corporation.

In April 2010 a small single-engine plane took off from Pearland Regional Airport and crashed shortly thereafter in Friendswood, about a mile south of the airport. The pilot was killed.

The land with the airport, "Area L", is an unincorporated area; it was annexed by the City of Pearland on November 27, 2017. However, in March 2018 the Pearland city council voted to deannex the territory. It was de-annexed effective March 26, 2018.

References

External links 

Airports in Texas
Airports in Greater Houston
Buildings and structures in Brazoria County, Texas
Transportation in Brazoria County, Texas